The Behren-Bokel Transmitter, also known as the Sprakensehl Transmitter is a 323-metre high guyed steel tube radio mast in Behren-Bokel near Uelzen in Lower Saxony, Germany. The mast is used for FM- and TV-broadcasting, and was at its erection time in 1961 the highest construction of West Germany.

See also
 List of masts

External links
 
 http://skyscraperpage.com/diagrams/?b46676

Radio masts and towers in Germany
Towers completed in 1961
1961 establishments in Germany